Stomatolina danblumi is a species of sea snail, a marine gastropod mollusk in the family Trochidae, the top snails.

Description
The size of the shell varies between 8 mm and 15 mm.

Distribution
This species occurs in the Red Sea.

References

External links
 

danblumi
Gastropods described in 1999